The Los Sauces River is a natural watercourse of the Traslasierra valley in the Córdoba Province of Argentina, originated in the limit of Mina Clavero with Cura Brochero, from the confluence of the river Mina Clavero with Panaholma. It is the second most important channel in the valley.

In the junction area where the river is born, the channel is sandwiched between large rocks of attractive shapes known as "Los Cajones" (The Drawers); and a few meters ahead is the natural spa "Los Elefantes" (The Elephants), since the ancient eroded rocks remind us of herds of elephants drinking in the river. The river then continues more calmly, forming extensive golden sand beaches.

About 20 km later, the channel receives the waters of the Río Chico de Nono, to end up later at the lake of La Viña Dam or "Ing. A. Medina Allende Reservoir", whose wall is 106 m high. There it is possible to practice nautical sports and fishing.

References

External links 
Hidrography of Córdoba on Google Earth 
Mina Clavero
La Viña Dam

Tourism in Argentina
Tourist attractions in Córdoba Province, Argentina
Populated places in Córdoba Province, Argentina